The Cholistan Desert, also locally known as Rohi, is a desert in the southern part of Punjab, Pakistan that forms part of the Greater Thar Desert, which extends to Sindh province and the Indian state of Rajasthan. It is one of two large deserts in Punjab, the other being the Thal Desert. The name is derived from the Turkic word chol, meaning "sands," and istan, a Persian suffix meaning "land of."

In ancient times, Cholistan was a fertile region with a large river fed by meltwater from the Himalayas, and so has a high density of ancient settlements from the Indus Valley civilization period dating back as early as 4000 BCE. The region later became a center for caravan trade, leading to the construction of numerous forts in the medieval period to protect trade routes - of which the Derawar Fort is the best-preserved example.

Geography 
The nearest major city is Bahawalpur city,  from the edge of the desert. The desert stretches about 480 kilometres in length, with a width varying between 32 and 192 kilometres. It is located between 27°42΄00΄΄ to 29° 45΄00΄΄ north, and 69°57' 30'′ to 72° 52' 30'′ east. 81% of the desert is sandy, while 19% is characterized by alluvial flats and small sandy dunes. The entire region is subject to desertification due to poor vegetation cover resulting in wind erosion.

Climate 
Cholistan's climate is characterized as an arid and semi-arid Tropical desert, with very low annual humidity. Summer temperatures can surpass , and sometimes rise over  during periods of drought. Average rainfall in Cholistan is up to 180mm, with July and August being the wettest months, although droughts are common. Water is collected seasonally in a system of natural pools called Toba, or manmade pools called Kund. Subsoil water is found at a depth of 30–40 meters, but is typically brackish, and unsuitable for most plant growth.

2022 Cholistan water crisis

In May 2022, in the desert areas of Cholistan in Pakistan many cattle died due to extreme heat and water shortage. Shepherds, including cattle, have started migrating from water-scarce areas. Toba Salem Sar and Toba Nawa Kahu were the worst affected areas where 50 sheep died due to lack of water while more data is being collected from the affected areas.

Geology 
Cholistan was formed during the Pleistocene period. Geologically, Cholistan is divided into the Greater Cholistan and Lesser Cholistan, which are roughly divided by the dry bed of the ancient Hakra River. Sand dunes in this area reach over 100 meters in height. Soil in the region is also highly saline.

Soil quality is generally poor with little organic matter in the Greater Cholistan, and compacted alluvial clays in the Lesser Cholistan. A canal system built during the British era led to irrigation of the northern part of Lesser Cholistan.

History 
Though now an arid region, Cholistan once had a large river flowing through it that was formed by the waters of the Sutlej and Yamuna Rivers. The dry bed of the Hakra River runs through the area, along which many settlements of the Indus Valley civilization/Harappan culture have been discovered, including the large urban site of Ganweriwal. The river system supported settlements in the region between 4000 BCE and 600 BCE when the river changed course. The river carried significant amounts of water, and flowed until at least where Derawar Fort is now located.

Over 400 Harappan sites had been listed in Cholistan in the 1970s, with a further 37 added in the 1990s. The high density of settlements in Cholistan suggest it may have been one of the most productive regions of the Indus Valley Civilization. In the post-Harappan period, Cholistan was part of the Cemetery H culture which grew as a surviving regional variant of the Harappan culture, which was then followed by the Painted Grey Ware culture.

The region became a center for caravan trade, leading to the construction of a dense network of forts in the medieval period - of which the Derawar Fort is the best-preserved example. Other large forts in Cholistan include Meergarh, Jaangarh, Marotgarh, Maujgarh, Dingarh, Khangarh, Khairgarh, Bijnotgarh and Islamgarh - with the suffix "garh" denoting "fort." These forts are part of the Tentative List of UNESCO World Heritage Sites, and run roughly parallel to the Indus and Sutlej Rivers 40 miles to the south. Smaller forts in the area include Bara, Bhagla, Duheinwala, Falji, Kandera, Liara, Murid, Machki, Nawankot, and Phulra forts.

Economy

Livestock

The backbone of Cholistan economy is animal rearing. Few other livelihood opportunities aside from livestock farming are available in the region. Agricultural farming away from the irrigated regions in Lower Cholistan are unavailable due to the lack of steady water-supply.

Camels in particular are prized in Cholistan for their meat and milk, use as transportation, and for entertainment such as racing and camel dancing. Two types of camels are found in Cholistan:  Marrecha, or Mahra, is used for transportation or racing/dancing. Berella is used for milk production, and can produce 10–15 liters of milk per day per animal.

It has the major importance for satisfying the area's major needs for cottage industry as well as milk meat and fat. Because of the nomadic way of life the main wealth of the people are their cattle that are bred for sale, milked or shorn for their wool. Moreover, isolated as they were, they had to depend upon themselves for all their needs like food, clothing, and all the items of daily use. So all their crafts initially stemmed from necessity but later on they started exporting their goods to the other places as well. The estimated number of livestock in the desert areas is 1.6 million.

Cotton and wool products

Cholistan produces a very superior type of carpet wool compared to that produced in other parts of Pakistan. From this wool they knit beautiful carpets, rugs, and other woolen items. This includes blankets, which is also a local necessity for the desert as it is not always dust and heat, but winter nights here are very cold too, usually below the freezing point. Khes and pattu are also manufactured with wool or cotton. Khes is a form of blanket with a field of black white and pattu has a white ground base. Cholistan is now selling the wool for it brings maximum profit.

Textiles

It may be mentioned that cotton textiles have always been a hallmark craft of the Indus Valley civilization. Various kinds of khaddar-cloth are made for local consumption, and fine khaddar bedclothes and coarse lungies are woven here. A beautiful cloth called Sufi is also woven of silk and cotton, or with cotton wrap and silk wool. Gargas are made with numerous patterns and color, having complicated embroidery, mirror, and patchwork. Ajrak is another specialty of Cholistan. It is a special and delicate printing technique on both sides of the cloth in indigo blue and red patterns covering the base cloth. Cotton turbans and shawls are also made here. Chunri is another form of dopattas, having innumerable colors and patterns like dots, squares, and circles on it.

People 
As per the 1998 Census of Pakistan, a total of 128,019 people, with a 2015 estimate of 229,071, with 70% living in Lesser Cholistan. The average household size is 6.65.

Local crafts
As mentioned above, the Indus Valley has always been occupied by the wandering nomadic tribes who are fond of isolated areas, as such areas allow them to lead life free of foreign intrusion, enabling them to establish their own individual and unique cultures. Cholistan till the era of Mughal rule had also been isolated from outside influence. During the rule of Mughal Emperor Akbar, it became a proper productive unit. The entire area was ruled by a host of kings who securely guarded their frontiers. The rulers were the great patrons of art, and the various crafts underwent a simultaneous and parallel development, influencing each other. Masons, stone carvers, artisans, artists, and designers started rebuilding the old cities and new sites, and with that flourished new courts, paintings, weaving, and pottery. The fields of architecture, sculpture, terra cotta, and pottery developed greatly in this phase.

Camel products
Camels are highly valued by the desert dwellers. Camels are not only useful for transportation and loading purposes, but its skin and wool are also quite valuable. Camel wool is spun and woven into beautiful woolen blankets known as falsies and into stylish and durable rugs. The camel's leather is also utilized in making caps, goblets, and expensive lampshades.

Leather work

Leather work is another important local cottage industry due to the large number of livestock here. Other than the products mentioned above, Khusa (shoes) is a specialty of this area. Cholistani khusas are very famous for the quality of workmanship, variety, and richness of designs especially when stitched and embroidered with golden or brightly-colored threads.

Jewelry 
The people of Cholistan are fond of jewelry, especially gold jewelry. The chief ornaments made and worn by them are Nath (nosegay), Katmala (necklace) Kangan (bracelet), and Pazeb (anklets). Gold and silver bangles are also a product of Cholistan. The locals similarly work in enamel, producing enamel buttons, earrings, bangles, and rings.

Ecology

Flora 
Subsoil water in Cholistan is typically brackish, and unsuitable for most plant growth. Native trees, shrubs, and grasses are drought tolerant. There are 131 plant species in Cholistan from 89 genera and 24 families. 
Most common of them are below;

 Prosopis cineraria 
 Haloxylon salicornicum 
 Cenchrus ciliaris 

A man-made forest called Dingarh was developed by The Pakistan Council of Research in Water Resources (PCRWR) on more than 100 ha. Dunes were fixed and stabilized by mechanical and vegetative means, and the area is now covered with trees with orchards of zizyphus, date palms, and grassland grown with collected rainwater and saline groundwater.

Fauna
The wildlife of Cholistan desert mostly consists of migratory birds, especially the Houbara bustard who migrates to this part during winter. This species of bird is most famous in the hunting season, even though they are endangered in Pakistan (vulnerable globally), according to the IUCN Red List. Their population has decreased from 4,746 in 2001 to just a few dozens in recent times. 
In December 2016, a Qatari prince had his hunting license rejected due to the species being endangered. Another prince, Dr. Fahad was fined with Rs. 80,000 ($760) and all of the birds he caught were set free for hunting without permit and license.
The other endangered species in this desert is the Chinkara. Their population has also decreased from 3,000 in 2007 to just a little above 1,000 in 2010 due to non-permit hunting of the species by influential political families.

Forts in Cholistan
Derawar Fort
Islamgarh Fort
Mirgarh Fort
Jamgarh Fort
Mojgarh Fort
Marot Fort
Phoolra Fort
Khangarh Fort
Khairgarh Fort
Nawankot Fort
Bijnot Fort

Terracotta

The Indus civilization was one of the earliest centres of pottery, and thus the pottery of Cholistan has a long history. Local soil is very fine and suitable for making pottery. The fineness of the earth can be observed on the Kacha houses which are actually plastered with mud but look like they have been white washed. The chief Cholistani ceramic articles are their surahies, piyalas, and glasses, remarkable for their lightness and fine finishing.

In earlier times, only the art of pottery and terracotta developed, but from the seventh century onwards, a large number of temples and images were also built on account of the intensified religious passions and the accumulation of wealth in cities.

See also 
 Khes

References

Mughal, M.R. 1997. Ancient Cholistan. Lahore: Feroz and Sons.

External links

 About Cholistan, Pakistan
 www.hashtagnation.net - Camels in Cholistan
 

 
Motorsport venues in Pakistan
Bahawalpur District
Deserts of Pakistan